Ben Caldwell is an American artist known for his work in toy design, animation development, children's book illustration, and comic book illustration.

Early life
Ben Caldwell graduated from the Parsons School of Design for Illustration, and Eugene Lang College for Ancient History.

Career
Most of Caldwell's work has been for DC Comics, Marvel Comics, Sterling Books, and ToyBiz (on projects including The Lord of the Rings, Spider-Man, X-Men, World Championship Wrestling, and Harry Potter). His comics cover work includes Justice League Unlimited, Red Sonja, Vampirella, All-Star Batman, John Carter of Mars/Mars Attacks, and Snagglepuss Chronicles. Caldwell's book and comic credits started with Wonder Woman children's books and the initial Star Wars: Clone Wars comic. Later comic work includes many one-shot and supplementary stories such as The Suicide Squad vs The Banana Splits, Superboy: Future's End, Justice League Unlimited, Convergence: Infinity Inc vs Jonah Hex, and random misadventures of Harley Quinn.

Ben Caldwell's most widely known work is the Action! Cartooning series of 'how-to' books and the All-Action Classics comics including Dracula, Tom Sawyer, The Odyssey, and The Wonderful Wizard of Oz for Sterling; script and art for an oversized (and polarizing) Wonder Woman story for DC Comics' Wednesday Comics series; the award-winning 2015 Prez reboot miniseries from DC Comics (w. Mark Russell), a 2016 run on A-Force for Marvel Comics (w. Kelly Thompson), and an as-yet untitled Carrie Kelley graphic novel (w. Frank Miller).

Caldwell began his comics career with the creator-owned and award-losing Dare Detectives comic, which has been reprinted or rebooted at various times. "Dare" was inspired by his Eighth Grade algebra class, as a way to avoid Eighth Grade Algebra.

Personal life
Ben Caldwell lives in Pennsylvania with his family and large collection of Chinese murder mysteries.

References

External links
Action! Cartooning (official site)
https://www.amazon.com/Dare-Detectives-Snow-Pea-Plot/dp/1936393417

Parsons School of Design alumni
Living people
1973 births
American cartoonists